The 52nd Homeland Defense Infantry Division (Korean: 제52보병사단) is a military formation of the ROKA. The 52nd division is subordinated to the Capital Defense Command and is headquartered in Gwangmyeong City, Gyeonggi Province. Its responsibility is the defense of Seoul and recruit training.

The division was created on 7 January 1984.

Organization 

 Headquarters:
Reconnaissance Battalion
Engineer Battalion
Mobile Battalion
Signal Battalion
Support Battalion
Military Police Battalion
Medical Battalion
Chemical Battalion
Intelligence Company	
Headquarters Company
 210th Infantry Brigade
 212th Infantry Brigade
 213th Infantry Brigade

References 

InfDiv0052
InfDiv0052SK
Military units and formations established in 1984